Atrevete a Olvidarme is Brenda K. Starr's eighth studio album, released in 2005. The album consists of Salsa and Pop.  All the songs give plenty of room for Starr's unique, charismatic vocals to shine. Includes the hit singles, "Tu Eres" and the title track. "Damelo" was also released as a single but it did not chart.

Track listing

Charts

References

2005 albums
Brenda K. Starr albums